Statistics of Swiss Super League in the 1939–40 season.

Overview
It was contested by 12 teams, and Servette FC Genève won the championship.

League standings

Results

Sources 
 Switzerland 1939-40 at RSSSF

Nationalliga seasons
Swiss
Swiss Super League